Blind Alley is a 1939 American film noir crime film directed by Charles Vidor and stars Chester Morris, Ralph Bellamy and Ann Dvorak. The film was adapted from the Broadway play of the same name by James Warwick.

It was remade as The Dark Past in 1948, with William Holden and Lee J. Cobb. The remake was also released by Columbia Pictures.

Plot
Hal Winston takes noted psychologist Dr. Shelby and his family hostage in their own home. Winston is a murderer and prison escapee with the cops on his tail. After meticulous planning with his accomplices, he forcefully enters the home of Dr. Shelby and threatens the occupants to remain complicit. During this time, Shelby examines Winston's psyche to reveal what has made the murderer who he is. Through many discussions, Shelby successfully uncovers the answers to his questions.

The film takes place over the course of one night, while the criminals wait for a boat to escape.

Cast
 Chester Morris as Hal Wilson
 Ralph Bellamy as Dr. Shelby
 Ann Dvorak as Mary
 Joan Perry as Linda Curtis
 Melville Cooper as George Curtis
 Rose Stradner as Doris Shelby
 John Eldredge as Dick Holbrook (as John Eldridge)
 Ann Doran as Agnes
 Marc Lawrence as Buck
 Stanley Brown as Fred Landis
 Scotty Beckett as Davy Shelby
 Milburn Stone as Nick
 Marie Blake as Harriet

Reception
David Sterritt of TCM praised Blind Alleys cinematography, and observed it had influenced the home invasion subgenre.

In 1939, The New York Times reviewer wrote: "the rather whimsical experiment of grafting Dr. Freud's facile theory of dream symbols on a typical Columbia melodrama has justified itself admirably in the case of Blind Alley, at the Globe, by producing, on the whole, a rather better-than-typical Columbia melodrama".

Radio adaptation
Blind Alley was presented on The Screen Guild Theatre on February 25, 1940. The adaptation starred Edward G. Robinson and Joseph Calleia in the starring roles.

Technical 
The film is in 1.37 : 1 aspect ratio and, printed, is 8 reels long.

See also
 List of American films of 1939

References

External links

1939 films
American black-and-white films
Films about psychiatry
American films based on plays
1939 crime drama films
Columbia Pictures films
Films directed by Charles Vidor
American crime drama films
1930s American films